Dichrorampha teichiana is a butterfly belonging to the family Tortricidae. The species was first described by Ivars Šulcs and Sakari Kerppola in 1997.

References

Grapholitini